Huadu District is one of 11 urban districts of the prefecture-level city of Guangzhou, the capital of Guangdong, China. It is located in the far northern suburbs of the city.

Xinhua Town is the seat of local government, and of the district CCP committee. 

While the Cantonese dialect is universally spoken, about 1/3 of the population consists of Hakka dialect speaking peoples. The district is the ancestral home of many Overseas Chinese.

Formerly known as Hua County, it was the hometown of many Taiping Rebellion leaders like Hong Xiuquan and Hong Rengan.

History
The district was established in the Qing dynasty (1644–1911) as a county, Hua County or Huaxian (also known as Fahsien), which was located north of the then city limits of Guangzhou.  It remained a county until 1993, when it was recognized as a city and renamed as Huadu.  In 2000, it became an attached northern suburban district of the expanded municipality of Guangzhou.

Natives of Huadu speak a dialect of Yue Chinese called Huaxian ( or Fahsien).  In addition to its population, Huadu is the hometown of approximately 300,000 overseas Chinese, including a large number in the Republic of Panamá, and some in Hong Kong and Macao.

Guangzhou Baiyun International Airport, Guangzhou's main airport, is located in the district, as is Guangzhou North Railway Station on the Wuhan–Guangzhou High-Speed Railway.

Resources
Huadu District is rich in natural resources. With a rich rainfall, Huadu is abundant in a variety of crops, vegetables, tea, litchis, bananas, longans, peanuts and sugarcane.

Jingtang Lotus Roots are thought to originate here in Jingtang Town.

The mines proved up are up to 18 varieties among which the largely-reserved and high-rank limestone, kaolin, clay and granite etc. have a bright future of mining. The district also is rich in water. The annual flux of the surface water on average for years is 1.15 billion cubic meters. There are 17 reservoirs of medium and small size in the district. The Liuxi River and Bajiang River are across the district.

Administrative divisions
There are currently 4 subdistricts and 6 towns.

On 2 December 2013 three new subdistricts (Huacheng, Xiuquan, & Xinya) were established from carving out Xinhua Subdistrict, while upgrading Yayao Town into a subdistrict.

Climate

Transportation

Metro
Huadu is currently service by two metro line operated by Guangzhou Metro:

 – Airport North, Airport South
 – Fei'eling, Huadu Auto City, Guangzhou North Station, Huacheng Lu, Huaguoshan Park, Huadu Square, Ma'anshan Park, Liantang, Qingbu, Qingtang

People 

 March Fong Eu, ancestry
 Hong Xiuquan, (Fuyuan Springs)

Sister cities 

 Markham, Canada, since Nov/Dec,2012

 Petrer, Spain, since Nov, 2020

References

External links

Official website of Huadu District Government
English website of Huadu District Government

 
Districts of Guangzhou